Corfu is a ghost town in Grant County, in the U.S. state of Washington. The community was named after the island of Corfu, in Greece.

Geography
Corfu is located in the valley of lower Crab Creek. The Saddle Mountains rise abruptly from the valley floor to the immediate south of Corfu to elevations over 2,000 feet.

History
The Chicago, Milwaukee, St. Paul and Pacific Railroad had a stop in Corfu from 1909. At its peak in the 1920s Corfu's population was 131 and home services like a store, gas, school and depot. The town's population declined dramatically as highway networks developed and bypassed Corfu. By 1930 the population had fallen by more than 50% from its peak. The rail line was discontinued in 1980.

A post office called Corfu was established in 1910, and remained in operation until 1943.

References

Unincorporated communities in Grant County, Washington
Unincorporated communities in Washington (state)
Ghost towns in Washington (state)